South Lake, California may refer to:
 South Lake, Kern County, California
 South Lake, Tulare County, California
 South Lake Tahoe, California